The 2015–16 European Rugby Champions Cup-Challenge Cup play-off was the second play-off for entry into the top level competition of European Club rugby union, the European Rugby Champions Cup.

Format
Following the two-team play-off in 2014–15, an expanded, four-team format was due to be used. However, on 24 September 2014, it was announced this would instead be a three-team play-off, with the highest placed non-qualifying team taking part.

To accommodate the longer season in the French Top 14, the format was announced as follows:
One team each would qualify from the Premiership and the Pro12, with each league being represented by the highest placed team not already qualified. These two teams would play in the first game, with home advantage in the match would be decided by a coin toss. In the event that the 2014–15 European Rugby Challenge Cup winner was a Premiership club, and it had not automatically qualified for the Champions Cup, it would take the place allocated to a Premiership team.
The winner of the first game would host the 7th placed team in the French Top 14. The winner of that game would qualify for the Champions Cup.

Gloucester became the first team to qualify for the play-off, taking the place allocated to the Premiership, when they beat Edinburgh 19–13 in the Challenge Cup final on 1 May 2015. This result meant that the 7th place team in the 2014–15 Premiership will no longer take part in the play-off, and will compete in the Challenge Cup. Connacht qualified next, when the finished seventh in the 2014–15 Pro12 with 50 points, narrowly edging Edinburgh who had 48 points. Bordeaux Bègles qualified for the play-off on 23 May 2015.

Connacht played Gloucester away at Gloucester's Kingsholm Stadium on Sunday 24 May 2015, with the venue having been decided earlier by a coin toss. It was decided that, in the event of a Gloucester win, the second play-off match would be played at Sixways Stadium in Worcester, to avoid a clash of fixtures with a Madness concert.

Teams

Matches

Match 1

Gloucester advanced to play Bordeaux Bègles. Connacht went on to compete in the 2015–16 European Rugby Challenge Cup.

Match 2

Bordeaux Bègles qualified for the 2015–16 European Rugby Champions Cup. Gloucester played in the 2015–16 European Rugby Challenge Cup.

See also
 2015–16 European Rugby Champions Cup
 2015–16 European Rugby Challenge Cup

References

2015-16
2015–16 European Rugby Champions Cup
2015–16 European Rugby Challenge Cup
2014–15 in English rugby union
2014–15 in French rugby union
2014–15 in Irish rugby union
Connacht Rugby matches
Gloucester Rugby